Murgseen are a group of lakes in Murgtal (Murg valley) in the Canton of St. Gallen, Switzerland. The three lakes are drained by the Murgbach river, which empties into Lake Walen at Murg in the municipality of Quarten.

The three lakes are:
Oberer Murgsee (or "Ober Murgsee", Upper lake) at an elevation of 1820 m; the largest, with a surface area of 20 ha
Mittlerer Murgsee (or "Mittlerer Murgsee") at 1808 m
Unterer Murgsee (or "Unter Murgsee", Lower lake) at 1682 m

External links

Lakes of Switzerland
Lakes of the canton of St. Gallen
LMurgseen